Joseph King Fenno Mansfield (December 22, 1803 – September 18, 1862) was a career United States Army officer, civil engineer, and a Union general in the American Civil War, mortally wounded at the Battle of Antietam.

Early life

Mansfield was born to Henry and Mary Fenno Mansfield in New Haven, Connecticut, a cousin of Joseph G. Totten. He entered the United States Military Academy when he was fourteen and graduated second in a class of forty in 1822. He then became a resident of Middletown, Connecticut before and during his military career. He was commissioned a second lieutenant in the U.S. Army Corps of Engineers. Advancement came slowly in the peacetime Army and he was promoted to first lieutenant in 1832, captain in 1838. In the Mexican–American War, he received a brevet promotion to major for the action at Fort Brown, Texas, on May 9, 1846. He was wounded in the leg at the Battle of Monterrey, and he received a brevet promotion to lieutenant colonel for his actions there. He was appointed a brevet colonel for the Battle of Buena Vista in 1847. After the war he was promoted to colonel and Inspector General of the U.S. Army on May 28, 1853.

Civil War
At the start of the Civil War, Mansfield commanded the Department of Washington (April 27 - August 17, 1861), and was promoted to brigadier general on May 6, 1861. General-in-chief Winfield Scott recommended Mansfield for command of the volunteer army being raised in Washington D.C. that spring, but the command went to Irvin McDowell instead. Mansfield was not considered the best choice due to his relatively advanced age and skepticism of volunteer troops and the administration's push for a quick drive on Richmond that would end the war in a few months, and he also lacked a political sponsor in Washington. After the Union rout at Bull Run, George McClellan was put in command of the war effort in the Eastern Theater and Mansfield's hopes of army command were again dashed. McClellan also did not offer him a command in the newly-created Army of the Potomac. Mansfield was stationed at Hatteras Inlet, North Carolina, in October, following the battle fought there by Benjamin Butler in August. He was a brigade commander in the Department of Virginia from March to June 1862. His only combat activity during this period was the firing of coastal batteries from Hampton Roads against the ironclad CSS Virginia in its naval battle against the USS Monitor on March 9, 1862. Until the fall of 1862, Mansfield commanded the Suffolk Division of the VII Corps of the Department of Virginia in the vicinity of Suffolk.

During the Maryland Campaign, when Confederate General Robert E. Lee invaded the North for the first time, Mansfield was given command of the XII Corps of the Army of the Potomac, as of September 15, 1862, two days prior to the Battle of Antietam. He arrived in the camp with 40 years of army experience, but no recent combat. He was white-haired and white-bearded, but had a vigorous manner that belied his age. His officers considered him nervous and fussy, but his men, many of whom were new recruits, liked him well enough due to his shows of blustery enthusiasm and fatherly assurance.

On the morning of September 17, 1862, the I Corps under Maj. Gen. Joseph Hooker attacked from the north, parallel to the Hagerstown Turnpike, smashing into the Confederate left flank. Mansfield's corps came immediately behind. As the lead brigade moved through an open field east of the Miller farmstead, they were subjected to fire by Confederate gunners, who took a terrible toll on the rookie soldiers. The troops were advancing in column formation, more suitable for marching, and their officers ordered deployment into open battle lines, which would reduce the risk of casualties from artillery shelling. Mansfield countermanded these orders, insisting they stay in column, because he was concerned that outside of the immediate control of their officers, the men would break and run. The result of this was to improve the mass of men that descended on the Confederate lines.

Mansfield personally led troops on his left flank, from the brigade of Brig. Gen. Samuel W. Crawford, in the East Woods. He returned to the rear to bring up more troops, and when he reached the line again he saw soldiers from the 10th Maine Infantry regiment firing into the woods. Mansfield, assuming that men from Hooker's corps were in the woods, rode down the regimental line crying out, "You are firing on our own men!" The soldiers convinced Mansfield that in fact they were not and were receiving heavy fire from the woods. Mansfield replied, "Yes, yes, you are right," and just then his horse was hit and a bullet caught him squarely in the right chest.  Writes Dr. Patrick Henry Flood, Surgeon, 107th NY Regiment, in a letter to his widow, "I found the clothing around his chest saturated with blood, and upon opening them, found he was wounded in the right breast, the ball penetrating about two inches from the nipple, and passing out the back, near the edge of the shoulder blade."

The general, tottering in his saddle, goaded the bleeding horse north along the Smoketown Road, away from the 10th Maine, until he came upon the right company of the 125th Pennsylvania. Captain Gardner (K Co.), who noticed that the general seemed ill, immediately called for some men to help the general dismountSergeant John Caho (K Co.) and Privates Sam Edmunson (K Co.) and E.S. Rudy (H Co.), with two stragglers, gently eased the bleeding officer from his horse. Forming a chair with their muskets, the five men picked up Mansfield and carried him to a lone tree in the rear of their line, where they left him to await the arrival of a surgeon.

He was taken to a field hospital at the George Line farm in Sharpsburg, where he died the next morning. He was interred in Mortimer Cemetery and re-interred in Indian Hill Cemetery, Middletown, Connecticut on May 30, 1867. He received a posthumous promotion to major general, backdated from July 18, 1862, for his gallantry at Antietam. Alpheus Williams became acting commander of the XII Corps after Mansfield fell.

Fort Mansfield, a coastal artillery installation in Westerly, Rhode Island, was named in his honor. Mansfield Avenue in the Antietam National Battlefield was also named for him. The Middletown Mansfields baseball team was named for him as well.

His nephew, Lt. Howard Mather Burnham of the 5th U.S. Light Artillery, Battery H, was killed in action in 1863 at the Battle of Chickamauga.

See also

 List of American Civil War generals (Union)
 List of people on United States banknotes

Notes

References
 Eicher, John H., and David J. Eicher. Civil War High Commands. Stanford, CA: Stanford University Press, 2001. .
 Heidler, David S., and Jeanne T. Heidler, "Joseph King Fenno Mansfield." In Encyclopedia of the American Civil War: A Political, Social, and Military History, edited by David S. Heidler and Jeanne T. Heidler. New York: W. W. Norton & Company, 2000. .
 Johnson, Mark W. That Body of Brave Men: The U.S. Regular Infantry and the Civil War in the West, 1861–1865. Cambridge, MA: Da Capo Press, 2003. .
 Sears, Stephen W. Landscape Turned Red: The Battle of Antietam. Boston: Houghton Mifflin, 1983. .

External links
 Battlefield monument to Mansfield

1803 births
1862 deaths
Burials at Indian Hill Cemetery
Union Army generals
United States Military Academy alumni
American military personnel of the Mexican–American War
People of Connecticut in the American Civil War
Union military personnel killed in the American Civil War
Military personnel from New Haven, Connecticut